Anzano di Puglia is a small town and comune in the province of Foggia and region of Apulia in southeast Italy.

The town lies along the Apennines, astride the Daunian Mountains at the intersection of two ancient Roman roads, namely Via Herculea and Via Aurelia Aeclanensis, which leads to Herdonias.
Such a geographical position has led to its possession changing several times over the centuries. At some times it has been in Apulia, at others in Campania. In 1810, when it belonged to the Kingdom of the Two Sicilies, it was made part of the province of Foggia. In 1862 it was absorbed by the province of Avellino and named "Anzano degli Irpini", but in 1931 it was returned to the province of Foggia. The town is part of the Roman Catholic Diocese of Ariano Irpino-Lacedonia and its territory borders the municipalities of Monteleone di Puglia, San Sossio Baronia, Sant'Agata di Puglia, Scampitella, Vallesaccarda, and Zungoli.

References

Cities and towns in Apulia